Uraga hyalina is a moth in the subfamily Arctiinae. It was described by Max Gaede in 1926. It is found in Rio Grande do Sul, Brazil.

References

Moths described in 1926
Arctiinae